Alan Lake (24 November 1940 – 10 October 1984) was an English actor, best known as the third and final husband of screen star Diana Dors.

Biography
Alan Lake was born in Stoke-on-Trent, Staffordshire on 24 November 1940. He studied acting at RADA, and began to work in television roles in 1964.

He is best known as the third husband of the actress Diana Dors, whom he met on the set of the 1968 television series The Inquisitors. He was initially not keen on Dors; his reaction on finding that he would be working with her was, "Oh no, not Madame Tits and Lips!", but within days, they had fallen in love and were married on 23 November 1968. Their stormy marriage produced a son, Jason David (1969 - 2019). Lake also had a daughter, Catherine Emma, born in 1967 with casting director Pamela Brown. Diana and Alan worked together in the early 1970s, on stage in plays such as Three Months Gone, for which Dors received her best critical reviews since Yield to the Night.They also received an offer to appear together in a TV sitcom, Queenie's Castle.

In July 1970, Lake was involved in a pub brawl for which he was sentenced to 18 months in prison, although he was released after serving a year. His friend, the singer Leapy Lee, was sentenced to three years for unlawfully wounding the pub's relief manager and was released after a year. Lake was a keen horseman, and on his release from prison Dors presented him with a mare named Sapphire. In 1972, Lake was unseated when the horse ran into the bough of a tree. He broke his back, and initially it was thought he might spend the rest of his life in a wheelchair. However, he was walking again within three weeks. After leaving hospital, unable to work while he recovered, and in severe pain, he began drinking heavily. Dors said of him at this time: "alcohol had unleashed a monster, uncontrollable and frightening".

Lake began hallucinating and experiencing psychotic episodes, but was diverted from drinking after becoming a Roman Catholic, also convincing Dors to follow him in adopting the faith. In 1974, Dors was rushed to hospital suffering from meningitis, and Lake fainted when he was told that she might not survive the night. In 1975, within months of her illness, at the age of 43, Dors became pregnant with their second child and was advised by doctors to have an abortion, but because of her newly-adopted religion, and regret at two previous abortions, she decided to go ahead with the pregnancy. She miscarried, which led Lake to return to heavy drinking.

For the remainder of the 1970s, Lake's once promising acting career was reduced to appearances in low-budget comedy films and small parts in television dramas. However, in 1974, he had a significant role as a singer Jack Daniels in the Slade vehicle Slade In Flame, and also as John Merrick in the first episode of the hugely popular TV series The Sweeney. Both he and Dors attended the film's premiere at the Metropole Theatre, Victoria, London, on 13 February 1975.

In 1980, the pair separated for a time, although they were reconciled when Lake promised to undergo treatment for his alcoholism. Lake's acting work became less frequent in the 1980s, and Dors' health began to deteriorate. She was diagnosed with ovarian cancer in 1982, and died in May 1984. Lake then burnt all of Dors' clothes, and fell into a depression. On 10 October 1984, five months after Dors' death, and 16 years to the day since they had first met, he took their teenage son Jason to the railway station, returned to his Sunningdale home, and killed himself by shooting himself in the mouth in their son's bedroom.

His roles included Herrick in the Doctor Who story Underworld; and parts in Cluff, Redcap, Sergeant Cork, The Saint, Public Eye, The Avengers, Department S, Dixon of Dock Green, The Protectors, Z-Cars, Softly, Softly: Taskforce, Crown Court, The Sweeney, Angels, Target, Hazel, Strangers, Blake's 7, Juliet Bravo, The Gentle Touch, Hart to Hart, and Bergerac.

In 1969, he recorded a pop single, "Good Times"/"Got To Have Tenderness" (the former a cover of a song written by Harry Nilsson), which was released by Ember Records (EMBS 278).

Acting roles

Film
 Catch Us If You Can, aka Having a Wild Weekend (1965) — Cameraman (uncredited)
 Sky West and Crooked, aka Gypsy Girl (1966) — Camlo
 The Christmas Tree (1966) — Truck driver (uncredited)
 Charlie Bubbles (1967) — Airman
 Freelance (1971) — Dean
 Swedish Wildcats (1972) — Bodyguard
 Hide and Seek (1972) — Lorrimer
 Layout for 5 Models (1972) — Andy
 Percy's Progress (1974) — Derry Hogan
 The Swordsman (1974) — Reynaud Duval
 The Amorous Milkman (1975) — Sandy
 Slade In Flame (1975) — Jack Daniels
 The Office Party (1976) — Mr Barnes
 The Playbirds (1978) — Harry Dougan
 Confessions from the David Galaxy Affair (1979) — David Galaxy
 Yesterday's Hero (1979) — Georgie Moore
 Don't Open Till Christmas (1984) — Giles Harrison

Television

 Catch Hand, episode "Fifteen-Bob-An-Hour Men" (1964) — Charlie
 No Hiding Place, episode "Real Class" (1964) — Third Player
 The Wednesday Play: Wear a Very Big Hat (1965) — Harry Atkins
 Cluff, episode "The Village Constable" (1965) — Tod Meller
 Mary Barton (1964), 1 episode — Knobstick
 The Wednesday Play: Stand Up, Nigel Barton (1965) (TV)
 Hereward the Wake: four episodes (1965) — Edwin
 Redcap, episode "The Moneylenders" (1966) — Lance Corporal Farrington
 The Saint, episode "Locate and Destroy" (1966) — Jacob
 Thirteen Against Fate, episode "The Traveller" (1966) — Robert Eloi
 The Avengers, episode "The House That Jack Built" (1966) — prison officer (uncredited)
 Thirty-Minute Theatre, episode "The Wake" (1967)
 The Wednesday Play: Dial Rudolph Valentino One One (1967) — Con
 Z-Cars, episode "She's Not Yours, She's Mine: Part 2" (1967) — Speedy
 Public Eye, episode "It Must Be the Architecture – Can't Be the Climate" (1968) — Murchinson
 Thief (1968)
 The Avengers, episode "The Forget-Me-Knot" (1968) — Karl
 A Bit of Crucifixion, Father (1968) — Gilbert
 Dixon of Dock Green, episode "A Quiet Sunday" (1968) — Kimber
 Dixon of Dock Green, episode "No Love Lost" (1969) — Keith Proctor
 The Contenders (miniseries, 1969) — Tom Stocker
 Department S, episode "Dead Men Die Twice" (1969) — The Dandy
 Dixon of Dock Green, episode "The Informant" (1972) — Dennis Brown
 The Protectors, episode "See No Evil" (1972) — — Thug
 The Adventurer, episode "Icons Are Forever" (1973) — Carlo
 Z-Cars, episode "Hi-Jack" (1973) — Brian Peake
 Dixon of Dock Green, episode "Knocker" (1974) — Jimmy Goddard
 Softly, Softly: Task Force, episode "See What You've Done" (1974) — Richard Spencer
 The Sweeney, episode "The Ringer" (1975) — Merrick
 Crown Court, episode "Two in the Mind of One" (1975)
 Z-Cars, episode "Tonight and Every Night" (1975) — Danny
 Dixon of Dock Green, episode "Domino" (1976) — Ron Mason
 Angels, episode "Celebration" (1976) — Tony
 Target, episode "Lady Luck" (1977) — Swain
 Z-Cars, episode "Error of Judgement" (1977) — Stan
 Doctor Who, episode "Underworld" (1978) — Herrick
 Play for Today: "Destiny" (1978) — Monty Goodman
 Hazell, episode "Hazell Settles the Accounts" (1978) — Creasey
 Z-Cars, episode "Driver" (1978) — George Armstrong
 The Black Stuff (1980) — Dominic
 Blake's 7, episode "Aftermath" (1980) — Chel
 Rumpole of the Bailey: "Rumpole's Return" (1980) — Meacher
 Juliet Bravo, episode "Trouble at T'Mill" (1980) — Ted Galway
 The Olympian Way (1981)
 Dick Turpin, episode "The Secret Folk" (1982) — Zsika
 The Gentle Touch, episode "Joker" (1982) — Malcolm Webster
 Juliet Bravo, episode "A Breach of the Peace" (1982) — Tom Tully
 Hart to Hart, episode "Passing Chance" (1983) — Nick
 Bergerac, episode "Tug of War" (1984) — Jack Broughton
 Juliet Bravo, episode "Work Force" (1984) — Grogan
 Hammer House of Mystery and Suspense: "Paint Me a Murder" (1984) — Davey

References

 Simon Sheridan Keeping the British End Up: Four Decades of Saucy Cinema (fourth edition) (Titan Publishing, London) (2011)

External links

 
 
 
 Alan Lake biography at Avengers Forever

1940 births
1984 deaths
Alumni of RADA
English male film actors
English male stage actors
English male television actors
English Roman Catholics
People from Stoke-on-Trent
Actors from Staffordshire
Suicides by firearm in England
20th-century English male actors
1984 suicides